was an Uesugi general, samurai and related to Uesugi Kenshin. He lived during the Sengoku era of Japan.

Kagenobu was a very respected retainer under Kenshin. He fought in the Uesugi campaigns in the Kanto region as well as at the Battles of Kawanakajima. He made supporting Uesugi Kagetora during the Siege of Otate.

References

Samurai
1578 deaths
Year of birth unknown